Archer City High School is a public high school located in Archer City, Texas, United States. It is part of the Archer City Independent School District located in central Archer County and classified as a 2A school by the UIL. In 2015, the school was rated "Met Standard" by the Texas Education Agency.

Athletics
The Archer City Wildcats compete in the following sports 

Baseball
Basketball
Cross Country
Football
Golf
Softball
Tennis
Track and Field
Volleyball

State Titles
Baseball - 
2007(1A)
Boys Basketball - 
1988(2A)
Girls Basketball - 
2004(1A/DI)  Also won Texas Cup.
Football - 
1964(1A)
Softball - 
2001(2A)

References

External links
Archer City ISD

Public high schools in Texas
Schools in Archer County, Texas
Public middle schools in Texas